Storakersvatnet or Akersvatnet is a lake in the municipality of Rana in Nordland county, Norway. The original lake was only , but a dam was built at the northern end so that it can serve as a reservoir for the Rana power station.

See also
 List of lakes in Norway
 Geography of Norway
 Rana Hydroelectric Power Station

References

Lakes of Nordland
Reservoirs in Norway
Rana, Norway